Lanesborough or Lanesboro may refer to:

 Earl of Lanesborough
 The Lanesborough, a hotel in central London, England
 Lanesborough School, an independent, preparatory school in Guildford, Surrey
 Lanesboro, Iowa
 Lanesborough, Massachusetts, USA
 Lanesboro, Minnesota
 Lanesboro, Pennsylvania
 Lanesborough–Ballyleague, Longford, Ireland